Cynthia Tucker (born 1954) is a Canadian politician. She represented the electoral district of Mount Lorne in the Yukon Legislative Assembly from 2000 to 2002. She was a member of the Yukon Liberal Party.

References

Yukon Liberal Party MLAs
Living people
Women MLAs in Yukon
1954 births